Borjana is a village in the Municipality of Kobarid in the Littoral region of Slovenia. It is located in the Breginj Combe.

Church

The parish church in the settlement is dedicated to Saint Catherine of Alexandria.

References

External links 

Borjana on Geopedia

Populated places in the Municipality of Kobarid